Boris Pavlov (Bulgarian: Борис Павлов, born 15 April 1946) is a retired Bulgarian equestrian. He competed in the individual and team show jumping events at the 1980 Summer Olympics and placed tenth and sixth, respectively.

References

Bulgarian male equestrians
1946 births
Living people
Olympic equestrians of Bulgaria
Equestrians at the 1980 Summer Olympics
20th-century Bulgarian people